Jordan Township is a township in Northumberland County, Pennsylvania, United States. The population at the 2010 Census was 794, an increase over the figure of 761 tabulated in 2000.

Geography 

Demographics 

As of the census of 2000, there were 761 people, 296 households, and 238 families residing in the township.  The population density was 44.0 people per square mile (17.0/km2).  There were 317 housing units at an average density of 18.3/sq mi (7.1/km2).  The racial makeup of the township was 99.87% White, 0.13% from other races. Hispanic or Latino of any race were 0.53% of the population.

There were 296 households, out of which 28.0% had children under the age of 18 living with them, 75.3% were married couples living together, 3.0% had a female householder with no husband present, and 19.3% were non-families. 15.5% of all households were made up of individuals, and 6.1% had someone living alone who was 65 years of age or older.  The average household size was 2.57 and the average family size was 2.86.

In the township the population was spread out, with 19.2% under the age of 18, 9.5% from 18 to 24, 26.8% from 25 to 44, 29.2% from 45 to 64, and 15.4% who were 65 years of age or older.  The median age was 43 years. For every 100 females, there were 97.7 males.  For every 100 females age 18 and over, there were 97.7 males.

The median income for a household in the township was $42,500, and the median income for a family was $45,625. Males had a median income of $29,375 versus $21,023 for females. The per capita income for the township was $16,839.  About 2.9% of families and 4.7% of the population were below the poverty line, including 6.6% of those under age 18 and 5.3% of those age 65 or over.

References 

Populated places established in 1778
Townships in Northumberland County, Pennsylvania
Townships in Pennsylvania